Elvis Noor Ojiambo (born 20 June 2001) is a Kenyan midfielder currently in the ranks of Kenyan Premier League side Nairobi City Stars.

Career
Elvis turned out for second-tier side Kibera Black Stars in the 2018-19 season before moving to Nairobi City Stars in mid-2019 after getting the nod from head coach Sanjin Alagic.

He earned his premier league debut in the first game of the 2020-21 season in Narok against Nzoia Sugar on Sunday, 29 November 2020.

Elvis is the elder sibling of City Stars attacking midfielder Timothy Ouma.

Honours

Club
Nairobi City Stars
National Super League
 Champions (1): 2019-20

References

Living people
2001 births
Nairobi City Stars players
Kenyan Premier League players
Kenyan footballers